White-label automatic banking machines (ABMs) are ATMs that provide an alternative source of cash dispensing vis-à-vis traditional automatic banking machines (ABMs) from banks. White-label ABMs may be operated by an independent ATM deployer.

Background
In Canada, the major financial institutions have their own branded ABMs located throughout the country. These ABMs prominently display the logo of the banks. White-label or "no name" ABMs, which are usually located in non-traditional places, display no major bank labels on the actual machine. Before 1997, only banks and other deposit taking financial institutions were allowed to be part of the Interac network. After 1997, independent operators were allowed to operate ABMs not owned by major financial institutions.

With a network of over 15,000 units, the NRT Technology Corporation is the largest processor of non-bank ABMs in Canada, handling more than 50 million transactions annually.

Fees
Customers usually pay an added fee to use these ABMs, which can be split between the private provider and the owner of the property hosting the machine.

According to the Financial Consumer Agency of Canada (FCAC), fees for using a white-label ATM can add up to over $6.00 per transaction. The same agency states that private operators are "not required to adhere to a minimum or maximum limit", meaning that the fee amount is up to the operator. The operator is obliged, however, to disclose the fee to be charged and give the consumer the option of cancelling the transaction.

CIBC has been criticized for creating a wholly owned subsidiary white-label company called Ready Cash. While many CIBC customers have free access to transactions with official CIBC accounts, since Ready Cash is not a bank they are charged twice, once by Ready Cash and again by CIBC.

Local small establishment retailers such as gas stations, bars and pubs, and restaurants are common locations for putting in private white-label ATMs to receive a fee for each transaction made at the ATM. Most white-label ATMs charge a minimum C$1.50 for the use of the machine with a percentage of that going to the retailer depending on their involvement with the ATM. The C$1.50 is above and beyond what the cardholder's financial institution may charge.

Notification of fees
A warning message will appear at some point prior to accepting to withdraw funds, advising the cardholder what the cost of the service is. There is always an opt out function to cancel the transaction and avoid paying the fees.

References

Automated teller machines
Banking in Canada